Droungos (Greek: , sometimes δρόγγος, drongos) or drungus is a late Roman and Byzantine term for a battalion-sized military unit, and later for a local command guarding mountain districts. Its commander was a "" or "" (δρουγγάριος), anglicized as "Drungary".

History and functions
The term  is first attested in Latin in the late 4th century AD. It derives from Gaulish * (see Old Irish ; Old Breton  or ), meaning "tribe", "group", "throng" or "crowd". An alternative Germanic etymology cited by some historians, originates in 17th-century guesswork which has been rejected by the overwhelming majority of philologists.

In the late 6th century, the Emperor Maurice (r. 582–602) applies  to a specific tactical deployment, usually of cavalry, characterised as a compact non-linear grouping suited to outflanking tactics, ambushes and irregular operations. He is the first author to employ the cognate adverb  (Greek: δρουγγιστί), with the sense of "in group formation" or "small-group tactics". Maurice also occasionally employs  as a generic expression for larger "groupings" or "formations" of troops, though in this sense he refers only to a "division" and never to a "brigade" with which  became associated in later sources. 

By the middle of the 7th century, this meaning had been superseded by a new meaning, which it held until the 11th century. In turn, each  was composed of several banda (singular: bandon). On occasion, it could rise to 3000 men, and Emperor Leo VI the Wise (r. 886–912) is recorded as having established  of only 400 men for the new smaller themes created during his reign.

From the late 12th century onwards, the term  was applied to mountainous areas in Greece, and was associated with the meaning of "pass" or "mountain range" (zygos). In the 13th century, it also came to designate the military units detailed to guard these locations, similar to the earlier kleisourai.

References

Sources

Subdivisions of the Byzantine Empire
Types of administrative division
Military units and formations of the Byzantine Empire
Mountain troops